Abraham Kiplagat (born 9 August 1984) is a Kenyan former middle-distance athlete.

Kiplagat, an 800 metres specialist, was second in the national trials for the 2010 Commonwealth Games and earned a late call up into the team when David Rudisha withdrew from the squad due to fatigue. At the games, held in Delhi, Kiplagat claimed a bronze medal in the 800 metres, which was won by his cousin Boaz Lalang. With Richard Kiplagat taking silver it was the first time in Commonwealth Games history that a nation had swept all 800 metre medals.

References

External links
Richard Kiplagat at World Athletics

1984 births
Living people
Kenyan male middle-distance runners
Athletes (track and field) at the 2010 Commonwealth Games
Commonwealth Games bronze medallists for Kenya
Commonwealth Games medallists in athletics
Medallists at the 2010 Commonwealth Games